Michael Norman Gardner (born March 9, 1967) is currently the football coach at Tabor College in Hillsboro, Kansas.  Having left Tabor for Malone in 2006, Gardner was chosen to replace Mike Gottsch after Tabor's winless 2009 season.  Gardner's teams achieved post-season play for his first five years as a head coach at the college level—the first two years qualifying for the NAIA playoffs and the next three years to the Victory Bowl.

Coaching history

Assistant coaching
Gardner began in coaching as Special Teams and Recruiting Coordinator at Hastings College from 1990 to 1993.  He later held assistant coaching positions at Bethel College (Kansas), Lindenwood University, and Tabor College.

Tabor
In 2004, he became the head coach at Tabor College and held that position until 2006.  During his time at Tabor his teams won two conference championships and advanced to the national playoffs.

Malone
Gardner was named head coach at Malone College following the 2006 season.  His team at Malone began the 2008 season ranked #24 in the NAIA pre-season poll. Following the lackluster 4-6 2009 season at Malone, Gardner resigned to clear the way for his return to Tabor. He stated “I wasn’t looking for an opportunity to go by any means,” Gardner said. “This just presented itself."

Gardner was the fifth football coach in Malone's history, and his coaching record at Malone was 25–18.

Tabor
Gardner returned to Tabor starting with the 2010 season and led the team to a record of 4 wins and six losses, finishing sixth in the conference.  Counting his previous two years coaching at Tabor, he is now the winningest coach in the history of the program.  Gardner continued success at Tabor, taking his team to the NAIA quarterfinals in the 2015 season and again earning conference Coach of the Year honors.  As of 2015, Gardner has been named Coach of the Year in the conference for four of his eight years at Tabor.

Playing career
Gardner played college football for NAIA school Baker University in Baldwin City, Kansas from 1986 to 1990, where he held a school record 53-yard field goal that was broken in 2007. He was an All-American each of his last three years at Baker.

Awards 
Gardner served as the Defensive Coordinator at Tabor from 2001 to 2003 and helped guide the Bluejays to their first-ever NAIA national playoff appearance in 2003 and a #15 NAIA national ranking.  He was named the AFCA NAIA Assistant Coach of the Year and the AFLAC Assistant Coach of the Year for the 2003 season.  His 2003 defense ranked 11th in the final NAIA statistics while his 2002 team ranked an impressive second overall.  In 2005, Gardner was named Kansas Collegiate Athletic Conference "Co-Coach" of the year along with Saint Mary coach Lance Hinson.  He earned the honor again after the 2012 campaign, this time holding the award as sole recipient.

As a player, Gardner was a three-time NAIA All-American and a four-time All-Conference selection while at Baker University (KS) and he played for a national championship in 1986.  He has been involved in 10 national playoff games as a player and eight as a coach and his 2005 Tabor squad won its first-round playoff contest.

Personal life
Gardner is a 1990 graduate of Baker University with a Bachelor's Degree in Physical Education.  He later earned a Master of Arts in Teaching at Hastings College in 1993.  Gardner and his wife have two children and live in Hillsboro.  He played junior high and high school football at Olathe South High School and Indian Trail Middle School in Olathe, Kansas plus his seventh grade year at Concordia Junior-Senior High School in Concordia, Kansas.

Head coaching record

References

External links
 Tabor profile

1967 births
Living people
Baker Wildcats football players
Bethel Threshers football coaches
Hastings Broncos football coaches
Lindenwood Lions football coaches
Malone Pioneers football coaches
Tabor Bluejays football coaches
People from Concordia, Kansas
People from Roeland Park, Kansas
Sportspeople from Olathe, Kansas
People from Marion County, Kansas